Jarle Aarbakke (born 18 November 1942) was the rector at the University of Tromsø, and is currently the mayor of Tromsø in Northern-Norway.

Before being elected rector in 2001, Aarbakke served as a professor of pharmacy at the Department of Medical Microbiology. From 2007 to 2009 he was chair of the Norwegian Association of Higher Education Institutions (UHR). 

In 1997 Aarbakke led a government committee for investigation of alternative and supplementary medicine.

References

External links 
 Articles by J Aarbakke in Google Scholar
 Management and Administration of the University of Tromsø

1942 births
Living people
Norwegian pharmacologists
Academic staff of the University of Tromsø
Rectors of the University of Tromsø